Eucamptognathus psilonyx is a species of ground beetle in the subfamily Pterostichinae. It was described by Alluaud in 1926.

References

Eucamptognathus
Beetles described in 1926